Nice as Fuck (NAF) is an all-female indie rock supergroup made up of Jenny Lewis (from Rilo Kiley), Erika Forster (of Au Revoir Simone), and Tennessee Thomas (of the Like). The band first performed at a rally for U.S. presidential candidate Bernie Sanders in April 2016 and went on to make their television debut in July 2016 on a live episode of The Late Show with Stephen Colbert during the 2016 Republican National Convention.

The band's self-titled first LP was released on June 24, 2016. The group toured with the Watson Twins and M. Ward.

Discography

Albums 
 Nice as Fuck (2016)

Single 
 "Door" (2016)

Music videos 
 "Door" (2016)
 "Guns" (2016)

References

All-female punk bands
American indie rock groups
Musical groups established in 2016
Musical groups disestablished in 2016